Codi Galloway is an American politician serving as a member of the Idaho House of Representatives from the 15th district. Elected in November 2020, she assumed office on December 1, 2020.

Early life and education 
Galloway was born in Panama City, Florida, and raised in Ada County, Idaho. She earned a Bachelor of Arts degree in education from Brigham Young University in 1999.

Career 
She worked as a public school teacher for three years before establishing a talent development school in Meridian, Idaho. She was elected to the Idaho House of Representatives in November 2020. She assumed office on December 1, 2020, succeeding Democratic incumbent Jake Ellis.

References 

Living people
People from Panama City, Florida
People from Ada County, Idaho
Brigham Young University alumni
People from Meridian, Idaho
Women state legislators in Idaho
Republican Party members of the Idaho House of Representatives
Year of birth missing (living people)